Cameron Scott Vieaux (born December 5, 1993) is an American professional baseball pitcher in the Los Angeles Angels organization. He has played in Major League Baseball (MLB) for the Pittsburgh Pirates. He made his MLB debut in 2022.

Amateur career
Vieaux graduated from Walled Lake Western High School in Commerce Township, Michigan. He played baseball for Walled Lake Western, but was not drafted out of high school. Vieaux enrolled at Michigan State University and walked on to the Michigan State Spartans baseball team. In 2015, as a redshirt sophomore, Vieaux had a 4-7 win-loss record and a 3.49 earned run average (ERA). He then played collegiate summer baseball with the Harwich Mariners of the Cape Cod Baseball League. The Detroit Tigers selected Vieaux in the 19th round, with the 580th overall selection, of the 2015 MLB draft. He did not sign, returning to Michigan State for another year. As Michigan State's top starting pitcher in 2016, Vieaux had a 7–4 win-loss record and a 2.28 earned run average.

Professional career

Pittsburgh Pirates
The Pirates chose Vieaux in the sixth round, with the 195th overall selection, of the 2016 MLB draft, and he signed with the Pirates for a reported $175,000 signing bonus. Vieaux played in the Pirates farm system, and turned to coaching when the 2020 minor league season was cancelled due to the COVID-19 pandemic. On June 17, 2022, the Pirates promoted Vieaux to the major leagues. He was designated for assignment on July 11. He cleared waivers and returned to the minor leagues. The Pirates promoted Vieaux back to the major leagues on August 21. On September 6, Vieaux was designated for assignment.

Los Angeles Angels
On December 31, 2022, Vieaux signed a minor league deal with the Los Angeles Angels.

References

External links

Living people
1993 births
People from Novi, Michigan
Baseball players from Michigan
Major League Baseball pitchers
Pittsburgh Pirates players
Michigan State Spartans baseball players
Harwich Mariners players
West Virginia Black Bears players
West Virginia Power players
Bradenton Marauders players
Altoona Curve players
Indianapolis Indians players
Lakeshore Chinooks players